Sir Separanlu-ye Sofla (also Romanized as Sīr Separānlū-ye Soflá; also known as Sīr Separānlū-ye Pā’īn, Sīr Sīrānlū-ye Pā’īn, Sīs Pārānlū-ye Pā’īn, and Sīspārānlū-ye Soflá) is a village in Jirestan Rural District, Sarhad District, Shirvan County, North Khorasan Province, Iran. At the 2006 census, its population was 95, in 27 families.

References 

Populated places in Shirvan County